The Doux is a tributary of the Rhône in the Haute-Loire and Ardèche departments, France. It begins in the Massif Central and joins the Rhône in Tournon-sur-Rhône. It passes through the town Lamastre. The Chemin de fer du Vivarais heritage railway from Tournon-sur-Rhône to Lamastre runs through the Doux valley.

References

Massif Central
Rivers of France
Rivers of Ardèche
Rivers of Haute-Loire
Rivers of Auvergne-Rhône-Alpes